Lawrence Murphy Jr. (born March 12, 1972 in Abington, Massachusetts) is an American actor and comedian, known for his work on the TV series Late Night with Conan O'Brien, Ugly Americans, Delocated and Bob's Burgers.

Career
Murphy began performing stand-up comedy in 1997 at the Comedy Studio in Harvard Square in Cambridge, Massachusetts. Soon after he teamed up with Brendon Small. Together they performed sketches and rock operas until 2001. Murphy's subsequent independent live work is a mix of sketch and characters. 

Murphy is a voice actor renowned for his versatility. He voiced all of the main characters on the Adult Swim comedy series Assy McGee and has lent his voice to several Soup2Nuts animated shows including O'Grady, Home Movies, and WordGirl. He voices Teddy in the animated Fox series Bob's Burgers. He voiced the hostile immigration officer Lt. Francis Grimes on the Comedy Central series Ugly Americans.

Murphy has appeared as a sketch actor on Late Night with Conan O'Brien and has a recurring role as "Jay the Doorman" on the Adult Swim live-action series Delocated.

He has toured with comedian Eugene Mirman and makes an appearance on his 2009 comedy album God is a Twelve-Year-Old Boy With Asperger's, providing the voice of Christopher Walken taking a customer service call.

Selected filmography

Film

Television

References

External links 
https://m.imdb.com/name/nm1926427

1972 births
Living people
American male television actors
American male voice actors
American stand-up comedians
Male actors from Massachusetts
People from Abington, Massachusetts
20th-century American comedians
21st-century American comedians